The Bulssi Japbyeon (roughly translated as 'Buddha's Nonsense') is a late 14th century Korean Neo-Confucian polemical critique of Buddhism by Jeong Dojeon. In this work he carried out his most comprehensive refutation of Buddhism, singling out Buddhist doctrines and practices for detailed criticism. 

Jeong stated that this book was written with the objective of refuting Buddhism once and for all "lest it destroy morality and eventually humanity itself." The charges leveled against Buddhism in the Bulssi japbyeon constitute a full inventory of the various arguments made by Confucians and Neo-Confucians from the time of the introduction of Buddhism into East Asia during the 2nd century CE. These arguments are arranged in eighteen sections, each of which criticises a particular aspect of Buddhist doctrine or practice.

See also
 Criticism of Buddhism
 Korean Confucianism
 Korean philosophy
 Religions of Korea

External links
 Full English translation of the Bulssi japbyeon with source text

Korean Confucianism
Korean literature
Buddhism-related controversies
Criticism of Buddhism
History of Buddhism in Korea
Buddhism in Joseon